Khurana (Hindi: खुराना) is a Hindu and Sikh surname from the Arora and Khatri communities found in India.

Notable people with the surname include:

Akash Khurana, Indian actor, screenwriter, theater artist and entrepreneur
Akarsh Khurana, Indian director, writer and actor
Arun Khurana, Indian cricketer
Aparshakti Khurana, Indian actor
Ayushmann Khurrana, Indian actor
Har Gobind Khorana, Indian American biochemist who won the Nobel Prize for his works in molecular biology
Harsh Khurana, Indian television actor
Himanshi Khurana, Indian model
Jatin Khurana, Indian actor
Kireet Khurana, Indian filmmaker
Madan Lal Khurana, Indian politician and former Chief Minister of Delhi
Nikhil Khurana, Indian actor
Paramjit Khurana, Indian scientist
Raj Khurana, Indian politician
Rakesh Khurana, American professor
Rishi Khurana, Indian television actor
Rohit Khurana, Indian television actor
Sachin Khurana, Indian model and actors and
Sandeep Khurana, Indian American music composer
Shanno Khurana, Indian classical vocalist and composer
Shashikant Khurana, Indian cricketer
Sundar Lal Khurana, Indian bureaucrats

References

Hindu surnames
Indian surnames
Surnames of Indian origin
Punjabi-language surnames
Khatri clans
Khatri surnames